Laguna Northwestern College (LNC) (formerly known as Laguna Northwestern Institute) is a non-sectarian, private college in Laguna, Philippines, founded on May 28, 1978 by the Entila family of San Pedro, Laguna. The Main Campus are in San Antonio, San Pedro City, Laguna.

History
Laguna Northwestern Institute was formally inaugurated on May 28, 1978. Classes started on June 13, 1978 with 192 students on the 1st and 2nd year High School. Succeeding years opened the 3rd and 4th year High School classes, kindergarten and grades one to four classes. By 1982, LNI offered classes from Pre-school up to 4th year secondary levels. Around 1984, the institution started offering college courses. LNC formerly exist in Santa Mesa Manila.

Government recognition was granted by the Department of Education, Culture and Sports in the following years:
 1981 Elementary and Secondary (High School)
 1982 Pre-Elementary (Nursery/Kindergarten/Preparatory)
 1984 Bachelor of Arts (Liberal Arts), 2-Year Junior Secretarial
 1984 short term courses on Typewriting, Stenography, General Clerical, Office Procedures
 1985 One-year Practical Electricity, Automotive Mechanics
 1986 Secondary (High School) Night
 1987 Bachelor of Science in Computer Engineering
 1987 Bachelor of Science in Commerce
 1988 Bachelor of Secondary Education
 1988 Bachelor of Elementary Education
 1988 Master of Arts in Education
 1988 Master in Business Administration
 1992 Graduate in Midwifery
 1993 One-year Refrigeration and Air Conditioning Courses
 1993 Associate in Computer Secretarial
 1994 Health Allied courses
 1995 Associate in Hotel & Restaurant Management
 1995 Bachelor of Science in Physical Therapy
 1995 Bachelor of Science in Nursing
 1996 Bachelor of Science in Occupational Therapy
 1998 Bachelor of Science in Hotel Restaurant Management
 2001 Health Care Giver
 2001 Bachelor of Science in Computer Science
 2003 Bachelor of Science in Accountancy
 2004 Master in Public Administration
 2016 Senior High School

College Student Organization
The first Laguna Northwestern College-Supreme Student Council (LNC-SSC) was founded on June 29, 2012. It consists of the Presidents and Vice-Presidents of each course and empowered by the department representatives. The officers were elected on the same day by means of nomination, in a consensus manner. The council was officially recognized by the school president, Dr. Rolando Entila on July 2, 2012.
The said council was founded by Ralph Ewoks Madronero (Secretary-General for Student Affairs and Relations) and Margarita Candy Concepcion (Head Chair for Student Affairs and Council). The first elected officers are Kevin Mchale Interno (President), Marwin Angelitud (Vice-President for Internal Affairs), and Camille Cedillo (Vice-President for External Affairs).

Other campuses
LNC-Pacita(defunct)
located at Pacita Ave., Pacita Complex, San Pedro, Laguna 4023

LNC-Corinthian Center (established 2002)
located at Balibago St., Sta. Rosa City, Laguna 4026

LNC-San Lorenzo Ruiz Montessori Center
located at Burgos St., Siniloan, Laguna 4019

Hymn
LNC Hym 

Hear our song of thanks to you, 
Alma mater dear, 
Thank you for the lessons we've learned, 
Lessons pure and true. 

Chorus: 
Laguna Northwestern College, 
Alma mater dear. 
The wisdom you have taught us 
Will guide us on our way 
Hearts and voices raising, 
Hear our songs of cheer. 

Our school has taught us to love, 
And fight for our right, 
Lead us to honor man, 
And worship God. 

( Repeat Chorus ) 

Laguna Northwestern College, 
Alma mater dear...

Notable School Achievements
In October 2011, the Philippine Chamber of Commerce and Industry (PCCI) with its chairman Miguel Varela, announced the winners of the annual search for the 5th Best Business Idea and Development Award (BIDA), an initiative to promote entrepreneurship among the youth and announced that the Laguna Norwestern College is one of the finalist in its Service category.

LNC is a member of Commission of Higher Education-University of the Philippines, Los Baños, Laguna, Philippines, LNC also Member Of ESC funded by the government of the Philippines.

References

External links
Philippine Chamber of Commerce and Industry

Education in San Pedro, Laguna
Educational institutions established in 1978
Universities and colleges in Laguna (province)
1978 establishments in the Philippines